The 2019 European Parliament election in Latvia is the election of the delegation from Latvia to the European Parliament in 2019. The previous elections were held in 2014.

The election uses the Sainte-Laguë method, which is weighted against the larger parties. That explains why, according to the results of one opinion poll, parties with 6% of the vote would be allocated one seat each, while a party with 17% of the vote would also be allocated only one seat.

Participating parties

Opinion polls

Results

Elected MEPs

References

External links
Central Election Commission
European Parliament Election Law

Latvia
European Parliament elections in Latvia
2019 in Latvia